Noardburgum is a village in Tytsjerksteradiel municipality in the Friesland province of the Netherlands.  It had a population of around 2,250 in January 2017.

History 
The village was first mentioned in 1718 as Bergumer heide. The current name means north of Burgum. Noardburgum developed in the 19th century as a heath cultivation project of Nicolaas Ypey.

The Protestant church was built between 1849 and 1850. The poorhouse was built in 1843, and is currently houses a clog museum.

A large complex for drinking water extraction in the region was constructed in the 1920s. In 1984, a decalcification unit was added to terrain. Noardburgum was awarded village status in 1930.

Gallery

References

Populated places in Friesland
Tytsjerksteradiel